Harley Parnell Hisner (November 6, 1926 – March 20, 2015) was an American starting pitcher in Major League Baseball who played in one game for the Boston Red Sox during the 1951 season.

In 1943, Hisner was the number two starter for City Light, a semipro baseball team in Fort Wayne, Indiana, that also included future Major League Baseball (MLB) pitchers Scott Cary and Ned Garver.

In his only MLB appearance, Hisner started the final game of the 1951 season for Boston against the New York Yankees. In six innings pitched, he gave up three earned runs, four bases on balls and seven hits, with three strikeouts — two of them being against Mickey Mantle, then a rookie. He was the losing pitcher (the Yanks' Spec Shea hurled a 3–0 shutout for the BoSox' ninth consecutive defeat) and Hisner never again appeared in a Major League game.  In that same game, Hisner gave up Joe DiMaggio's last regular season hit.

On April 20, 2012 Hisner was one of nearly 200 former Red Sox players and coaches who returned to Fenway Park as part of Fenway's 100th Anniversary celebration. He died of cancer in 2015.

References

External links

Retrosheet

1926 births
2015 deaths
Baseball players from Indiana
Boston Red Sox players
Deaths from cancer in Indiana
Dallas Eagles players
Louisville Colonels (minor league) players
Major League Baseball pitchers
People from Allen County, Indiana
San Diego Padres (minor league) players
San Jose Red Sox players
Scranton Red Sox players
Syracuse Chiefs players
Wichita Falls Spudders players